Mask is the seventh studio album by Japanese singer-songwriter Aco, released on 22 February 2006. It is a mini-album consisting of six songs and with a total playing time of 25 minutes.

Mask marks a significant transition in Aco's style from ambient, electronic sounds of her previous two albums, Material and Irony, to lighter, electro-pop music.

Track 3 is a cover of the song of the same name by The Waitresses.

Track listing 
 Ya-yo!
 Guilty
 I Know What Boys Like
 
 Cover Grrrl

References

External links 

 

2006 albums
Aco (musician) albums